Velimir Terzić (26 May 1908 – 13 December 1983) was a Yugoslav People's Army captain, partisan general, and historian.

Military career 
Terzić was born on 26 May 1908 in Golubovci, near Podgorica, Montenegro. Prior to World War II, he was captain of the Royal Yugoslav Army.

After Yugoslavia's defeat in the April War, he joined the Montenegrin partisans and took part in the 13 July Uprising. He commanded the Bijelo Polje unit. By the summer of 1942, he became the deputy of general Arso Jovanović, chief of partisan Supreme HQ. Terzić  also commanded the main staff of Montenegro, was deputy commander of the 5th Montenegrin Proletarian brigade, chief of staff of the fifth operative zone and the main staff of Croatia. In April 1944, along with Milovan Djilas, he headed a Yugoslav military mission to the Soviet Union.

After the war, he remained in the Yugoslav People's Army and had many roles, including chief inspector and head of the Military Academy. He retired from the army in 1955 and became head of the Military History Institute (Vojno-istorijski institut) in Belgrade.

Work as historian 
In 1963, Terzić's Jugoslavija u aprìlskom ratu 1941 was published, a monograph which explored the reasons behind Yugoslavia's defeat in the April war. In it Terzić lists a Croatian fifth column as an important factor in the Yugoslav army's fall. He singles out Croatian Peasant Party leader Vladko Maček as having collaborated with the Ustaše and negotiating with the Axis powers, which led to a sedition among Croatian forces resulting in the collapse of the whole army. According to Terzić, many Croats abandoned Yugoslavia in favor of an independent Croatian state and enthusiastically welcomed German troops into Zagreb.

The historian Wayne S. Vucinich cites the book as among "the best studies of the coup d'état to appear in Yugoslavia" at the time but also notes that it was controversial. It sparked a wave of criticism in Croatia and condemnation from the Communist Party Press. Among the criticism levied at Terzić were that he relied on half-truths, poor sources and oversimplified the situation, in addition to ignoring the official Communist Party narrative for the Yugoslav capitulation. Stjepan Ščetarić, a scholar from Yugoslavia, criticized Terzić for focusing on the behavior of individual peoples as opposed to more pertinent issues, such as the relations between different Yugoslav nationalities, corruption and lack of preparation by the state and military leadership, as well as the broader aggression on the part of the Axis forces. Jozo Tomasevich writes that Terzić's claim that Maček left the government to negotiate with Germans without notifying anyone is wrong. He also says that the fifth column had little effect on the ultimate outcome of the invasion. The scholar Aleksa Djilas writes that "despite the considerable evidence" Terzić shows, he tends to overplay the Croatian desertion, as many Croatian units actively fought the Germans and most Croatian officers "remained loyal until 10 April when the NDH was proclaimed" which brought an end to Yugoslavia and in turn, their loyalty to the government. He adds that the army simply reflected the weak Yugoslav political system and the main reasons for the defeat were the lack of leadership, the army's subpar equipment and outdated tactical and strategical techniques.

During the 1960s, Yugoslav WWII historiography shifted from a "brotherhood and unity" narrative to debates between Serbian and Croatian nationalists about each group's role in the war, leading Josip Broz Tito and his Communist Party to repeatedly denounce "bourgeois nationalist tendencies" in historiography. Terzić's book exacerbated tensions. His work prompted another former Partisan general-turned historian, and future President of Croatia Franjo Tudjman to publish his own thesis in which he highlighted the impact of "Great Serbian hegemonism" of the Yugoslav Kingdom. The 1983 expanded edition of the book once again received sharp rebuke in Croatia, and contributed to the growth of Serbian nationalism. The historian Kenneth Morrison writes that it is an "exceptionally detailed analysis of the events that led to the dismemberment and occupation of Yugoslavia."

In August 1983, Terzić made the exaggerated claim that a million Serbs were killed at the Jasenovac concentration camp.

Bibliography 
 "Završne operacije Jugoslovenske Armije 1945 godine" in Istoriski Zapisi Vol. 18, Issue 2. (1961)
 Jugoslavija u aprìlskom ratu 1941 , Titograd; Grafički zavod. (1963)
 Slom Kraljevine Jugoslavije 1941, two vols. Belgrade; Narodna Knjiga. (1982-1983)

Honours

References

Sources 
Books

 
 
 
 
 
 
 
 

1908 births
1983 deaths
Yugoslav Partisans members
Generals of the Yugoslav People's Army
Yugoslav historians